Baptiste Jules Henri Jacques Giffard (8 February 182514 April 1882) was a French engineer. In 1852 he invented the steam injector and the powered Giffard dirigible airship.

Career
Giffard was born in Paris in 1825. He invented the injector and the Giffard dirigible, an airship powered with a steam engine and weighing over 180 kg (400 lb). It was the world's first passenger-carrying airship (then known as a dirigible, from French). Both practical and steerable, the hydrogen-filled airship was equipped with a 3 hp steam engine that drove a propeller. The engine was fitted with a downward-pointing funnel. The exhaust steam was mixed in with the combustion gases and it was hoped by these means to stop sparks rising up to the gas bag; he also installed a vertical rudder.

On 24 September 1852, Giffard made the first powered and controlled flight travelling 27 km from Paris to Élancourt. The wind was too strong to allow him to make way against it, so he was unable to return to the start. However, he was able to make turns and circles, proving that a powered airship could be steered and controlled.

Giffard was granted a patent for the injector on 8 May 1858. Unusually, he had thoroughly worked out the theory of this invention before making any experimental instrument, having explained the idea in 1850. Others had worked on using jets, particularly Eugène Bourdon who patented a very similar device in 1857.

In 1863, he was appointed a Chevalier of the Légion d'honneur.

Death and commemoration
In response to his declining eyesight, Giffard committed suicide in 1882, leaving his estate to the nation for humanitarian and scientific purposes.

Gallery

See also
 List of firsts in aviation
 Alberto Santos-Dumont

References

Bibliography
 
 
 , ...Correspondence, notes, design drawings, broadsides, newspapers, printed illustrations, articles about Giffard, and newspaper clippings relating chiefly to Giffard's exhibition of a large captive balloon in the courtyard of the Tuileries in Paris in 1878. Includes his notes on hydrogen gas and design drawings for balloons...

External links

 - discusses Henri Giffard's first powered flight, LiveScience.com, 4 March 2008

1825 births
1882 deaths
Engineers from Paris
Burials at Père Lachaise Cemetery
French mechanical engineers
French balloonists
Chevaliers of the Légion d'honneur
Airship aviators
Airship designers
Steam-powered aircraft
1880s suicides